"Is This the Life" (also written "Is This the Life?") is a song by English rock band Cardiacs from their debut studio album A Little Man and a House and the Whole World Window (1988). The song was released on vinyl by the Alphabet Business Concern and Torso on 16 April 1988 as the only single from the album. The song was previously recorded for the demo albums Toy World (1981) and The Seaside (1984). It also briefly attained chart success (peaking at number 80) after being played on various Radio 1 shows thanks to DJ Liz Kershaw. The Torso version of the 7" is exactly the same as the Alphabet release although it comes in a paper sleeve instead of a cardboard one. Only the Torso 12" differs in both track listing and cover design.

Track listing

 Seven-inch single
 "Is This the Life" – 5:36
 "I'm Eating in Bed" – 5:06

 Twelve-inch single
 "Is This the Life" – 5:36
 "Goosegash" – 1:56
 "I'm Eating in Bed" – 5:06

Personnel 
 Tim Smith – vocals, guitar
 Jim Smith – bass
 Sarah Smith – saxophone
 William D. Drake – keyboards
 Dominic Luckman – drums
 Tim Quy – percussion

Charts

Notes

References

External links 
 
 

Cardiacs songs
1988 singles
1981 songs
Songs written by Tim Smith (Cardiacs)